The Bounty Islands ("Island of angry wind") are a small group of 13 uninhabited granite islets and numerous rocks, with a combined area of circa  in the South Pacific Ocean. The group is a World Heritage Site.

The islands are listed with the New Zealand Outlying Islands. The islands are an immediate part of New Zealand, but not part of any region or district. Rather, they are listed as an Area Outside Territorial Authority, similar to all other outlying islands except for the Solander Islands / Hautere.

History
Captain William Bligh discovered the Bounty Islands en route from Spithead to Tahiti in 1788, and named them after his ship HMS Bounty, just months before the famous mutiny. The location of the islands were only roughly marked on charts. In early 1866 Commander W. H. Norman of HMVS Victoria (1855) was tasked with determining more accurately their position. He reported them as being latitude 47ˈ50 South and longitude 179ˈ00 East. Captain George Palmer, during the search for the Matoaka placed the islands at 47ˈ46ˈ24 South 178ˈ56ˈ45 East. Palmer also annexed the islands for New Zealand.

During the 19th century the area was a popular hunting-ground for sealers. The islands were also searched from time to time for missing ships and crews, including those from the General Grant and the Matoaka.

The Hinemoa visited the islands in March 1886 and erected a depot for marooned sailors on the largest island. Captain Fairchild noted that there was no fresh water available on these islands. The depot had been destroyed by the sea by the time the Stella visited the island in 1887. A new Admiralty chart 1022 was issued for the area in 1888, which took into account survey work undertaken by the Hinemoa.

In November 1891 the Hinemoa returned to the islands and built a fresh provisions storage.

Flora and fauna
Ecologically, the islands are part of the Antipodes Subantarctic Islands tundra ecoregion.  Plants include Cook's scurvy grass. The group is home to an endemic spider, endemic insects, and large numbers of seabirds.

Important Bird Area
The Bounty group has been identified as an Important Bird Area (IBA) by BirdLife International because of its significance as a breeding site for erect-crested penguins, Salvin's albatrosses and Bounty shags.

Geography
The total area is only . The islands are at the antipodes of Bouillé-Ménard, in France (Pays de la Loire).

The Main Group is the largest of the three groups, and is located in the northwest of the chain. It includes the group's largest island, Depot Island, which is around 700 metres in length and 400 metres across at its widest point. Proclamation and Tunnel Islands are separated from Depot Island by only a narrow cleft, and are joined to it at low tide. A small islet off the north coast of this group's Spider Island is the chain's northernmost point; the westernmost point is the western tip of Penguin Island.

The Centre Group is located some 1.5 to 2 kilometres to the southeast of the Main Group, and contains three main islands, arrayed in a north–south line. A smaller islet lies immediately to the west. A further 1.5 kilometres to the east is the East Group, which is also arrayed roughly in a north–south line. This group contains two large islets and one small islet, along with several reefs and stacks, one of which is the easternmost point in the chain.

Islands
Main Group:
 Depot Island (largest in the group), named for the castaway depot on the island.
 Dog Rock
 Lion Island
 Penguin Island
 Proclamation Island
 Ranfurly Island
 Ruatara Island
 Seal Rock
 Skua Rock
 Spider Island
 Tunnel Island
Centre Group:
 Coronet Island
 Funnel Island (main islet)
 Prion Island
East Group:
 Con Island
 Molly Cap (main islet)
 North Rock

See also 

 List of Antarctic and subantarctic islands
 List of islands of New Zealand
 List of islands
 New Zealand subantarctic islands
 Water hemisphere
 Bounty Islands nonmarine fauna
 Campbell Plateau
 Desert island

References

New Zealand subantarctic islands
Uninhabited islands of New Zealand
Important Bird Areas of New Zealand
Archipelagoes of the Southern Ocean
Islands of the New Zealand outlying islands
Bounty Islands